The Mexican shrew (Megasorex gigas) is a species of mammal from the subfamily Soricinae in the family Soricidae. It is monotypic within the genus Megasorex and is endemic to Mexico.

References

Endemic mammals of Mexico
Red-toothed shrews
Mammals described in 1897
Taxonomy articles created by Polbot
Jalisco dry forests